William Sommers or William Somers may refer to:

 Will Sommers (died 1560), court jester of Henry VIII of England
 William Somers (born c.1850), Scottish international footballer
 Bill Sommers (William Dunn Sommers, 1923–2000), American professional baseball player
 William P. Sommers (died 2007), CEO of SRI International, 1993–1998
 William Thomas Somers (1916–1994), mayor of Atlantic City, New Jersey, 1969–1972